Punta Carnero may refer to:

 Punta Carnero, Spain
 Punta Carnero, Ecuador